St Peter's Church is a large Roman Catholic church located in Phibsborough, in the north of Dublin.

History

In the early 19th century, Phibsborough was a crime-ridden suburb home to many families living in poverty. Ultimately, the concern for the children of Phibsborough resulted in the founding of a Catholic school in 1826. Two of the priests running this school, Rev. W. Young and Rev. W. Carroll, converted the top floor of the school into a chapel. 

In 1838 the Vincentian order, under Dean Philip Dowley, took over the running of the church. 

In 1843, new school buildings were built to house the growing number of students. In 1907, work on the spire apparently commenced after Cardinal Moran of Australia commented on the lack of Catholic church spires in the Dublin skyline.

St Peter's Church is recognised as an important landmark in North Dublin. In 1984 Bernard Neary wrote:

Decorative 
St. Peter's is noted for its beautiful stained glass windows, particularly the west window and Harry Clarke's early masterpiece entitled The Adoration of the Sacred Heart. The window depicts, among scenes of the life of Jesus Christ, the adoration of the Sacred Heart with Ss. Mary Magdalene and John the Evangelist. 

St. Peters is richly decorated with Gothic embellishments, such as gargoyles, pinnacles, bosses and columns made from Newry granite.

Organ 
The pipe organ, dating from 1910, is originally a Magahy instrument. The instrument was majorly rebuilt and refurbished between 1947 and 1949 by the Conacher organ company. At this time it was a very highly-regarded instrument. In 1952, Jeanne Demessieux gave a recital here.

Specification Of The St. Peter's Organ

Gallery

References

External links

Church website

Gothic Revival church buildings in the Republic of Ireland
Churches of the Roman Catholic Archdiocese of Dublin
Roman Catholic churches in Dublin (city)